Raisin black is a color that is a representation of the color of black raisins.

References

See also
List of colors